Chukyleva is a rural locality (a village) in Yorgvinskoye Rural Settlement, Kudymkarsky District, Perm Krai, Russia. The population was 25 as of 2010.

Geography 
Chukyleva is located 22 km north of Kudymkar (the district's administrative centre) by road. Mizhuyeva is the nearest rural locality.

References 

Rural localities in Kudymkarsky District